The  is a historic theatre in Vienna located on the Left Wienzeile in the Mariahilf district. Completed in 1801, the theatre has hosted the premieres of many celebrated works of theatre, opera, and symphonic music. Since 2006, it has served primarily as an opera house, hosting its own company.

Although "" is German for "Vienna", the "" in the name of the theatre is actually the name of the Wien River, which once flowed by the theatre site; "" means "on the banks of the Wien". In modern times, the river has been covered over in this location and the covered riverbed now houses the Naschmarkt, an open-air market.

History

Early history 

The theatre was the brainchild of the Viennese theatrical impresario Emanuel Schikaneder, who is best known as Mozart's librettist and collaborator on the opera The Magic Flute (1791). Schikaneder's troupe had already been successfully performing for several years in Vienna in the smaller  and this is where The Magic Flute had premiered. As the troupe's performances often emphasized spectacle and scenery, the librettist felt ready to move to a larger and better equipped venue.

He had already been granted an imperial licence to build a new theatre in 1786, but it was only in 1798 that he felt ready to act on this authorization. The building was designed by the architect Franz Jäger in Empire style (it has since been remodeled). Construction was completed in 1801. The theatre has been described as "the most lavishly equipped and one of the largest theatres of its age.".

The theatre opened on 13 June 1801 with a prologue written by Schikaneder followed by a performance of the opera Alexander by Franz Teyber. The new theatre proved to be a sensation. Adolf Bäurle, a local critic, wrote "if Schikaneder and [his partner] Zitterbarth had had the idea ... to charge admission simply for looking at the glories of their , Schikaneder would certainly have been able to take in vast sums of money without giving one single performance." The Allgemeine musikalische Zeitung called it the "most comfortable and satisfactory in the whole of Germany" (which meant at the time, "all German-speaking lands").

In 1807 the theatre was acquired by a group of court nobles that included Count Ferdinand Palffy von Erdöd, who bought it outright in 1813. During the period of his proprietorship, which lasted until 1826, he offered opera and ballet and, to appeal to a wider Viennese audience, popular pantomime and variety acts, losing money in elaborate spectacles until finally he was forced to sell the theatre at auction in 1826.

He is accompanied by the Three Boys, characters in the same opera.

From 1889 to 1905, Alexandrine von Schönerer was managing director after the lease ended in 1884 between her and the librettist Camillo Walzel.

In the late 19th to early 20th centuries, the theatre experienced a golden age during the flourishing of Viennese operetta, as referenced in the list below.

Later history 

From 1945 to 1955, it was one of the temporary homes of the Vienna State Opera, whose own building had been destroyed by Allied bombing during World War II. However, in 1955, the theatre was closed for safety reasons. It languished unused for several years, and by the early 1960s, the threat had emerged that it would be converted to a parking garage. (This was the same era of "urban renewal" that in America nearly destroyed Carnegie Hall).

By 1962 the theatre had a new and successful role as a venue for contemporary musical theatre. Many English-language musicals had their German premieres there. In 1992, the musical Elisabeth (about Franz Joseph I of Austria's wife, Elisabeth of Bavaria, also known as Sisi), premiered there and ran for six consecutive years until 1998; Elisabeth went on to become the most successful German-language musical to date, returning to the Theater an der Wien for a revival production from 2003 to 2005. The musical Cats directed and choreographed by Gillian Lynne played successfully for seven years.

Despite its focus on operettas and musicals, the theatre still served as a venue for occasional opera productions, especially during the Vienna Festival seasons, and sometimes co-produced with the Vienna State Opera. Notable productions of the non-standard repertory include:
 Alban Berg's Lulu (1962), conducted by Karl Böhm, staged by Otto Schenk, designed by Caspar Neher, and starring Evelyn Lear
 Joseph Haydn's Orfeo ed Euridice (1967), conducted by Richard Bonynge, staged by Rudolf Hartmann, and starring  Nicolai Gedda and Joan Sutherland
 Claudio Monteverdi's Il ritorno d'Ulisse in patria (1971), conducted by Nikolaus Harnoncourt, and staged by Federik Mirdita
 Wolfgang Amadeus Mozart's La clemenza di Tito (1976), conducted by Julius Rudel, staged by Mirdita, and starring Werner Hollweg, Teresa Berganza, Arleen Augér, and Edda Moser
 Franz Schubert's Fierrabras (1988), conducted by Claudio Abbado, staged by Ruth Berghaus, and starring Thomas Hampson, Karita Mattila, and László Polgár
 The world premiere of Adriana Hölszky's Die Wände (1995), conducted by Ulf Schirmer, and staged by Hans Neuenfels
Between 1996 and 2002, Riccardo Muti conducted new productions of the three da Ponte operas of Mozart, based on an original production by Giorgio Strehler.

Today 
Major musical productions since are now presented at either the Raimund Theater or the Ronacher. The first opera to be given was Mozart's Idomeneo with Neil Shicoff in the title role and Peter Schneider conducting the new production by Willy Decker. Other members of the cast were Angelika Kirchschlager, Genia Kühmeier, and Barbara Frittoli.

Geyer is quoted as saying that he wishes to "present cutting edge directors and interesting productions", and his three main areas of focus are on Baroque opera, contemporary opera, and Mozart.

In recent years, the theatre's seasons have included the following works outside the standard repertoire:

Ian Bell: The Harlot's Progress with Diana Damrau in the title role.
Hector Berlioz: Béatrice et Bénédict, conducted by Leo Hussain, staged by Kasper Holten featuring Malena Ernman and Christiane Karg
Claude Debussy: Pelléas et Mélisande conducted by Bertrand de Billy
Christoph Willibald Gluck: Orfeo ed Euridice conducted by René Jacobs
George Frideric Handel:
Ariodante, conducted by Christophe Rousset, staged by Lukas Hemleb
Partenope, conducted by Christophe Rousset, staged by Pierre Audi
Semele, conducted by William Christie (with Les Arts Florissants), staged by Robert Carsen, featuring Cecilia Bartoli
Radamisto, conducted by René Jacobs, staged by Vincent Boussard featuring David Daniels
Joseph Haydn: Orlando paladino; conducted by Nikolaus Harnoncourt, staged by Keith Warner
Jake Heggie: Dead Man Walking, conducted by Sian Edwards, staged by Nikolaus Lehnhoff
Leoš Janáček: Káťa Kabanová, conducted by Kirill Petrenko, staging by Keith Warner
Wolfgang Amadeus Mozart:
La finta semplice, conducted by Fabio Luisi, staged by Laurent Pelly;
Mitridate, re di Ponto conducted by Harry Bicket, staged by Robert Carsen;
Idomeneo, conducted by René Jacobs, staged by Damiano Michieletto
Francis Poulenc: Dialogues des Carmélites; conducted by Bertrand de Billy, staged by Robert Carsen
André Previn: A Streetcar Named Desire, conducted by Sian Edwards, staged by Stein Winge
Jean-Philippe Rameau: Platée, conducted by William Christie, staged by Robert Carsen
Richard Strauss: Intermezzo conducted by Kirill Petrenko
Igor Stravinsky: The Rake's Progress conducted by Nikolaus Harnoncourt
Giacomo Puccini:Il trittico, conducted by Rani Calderon, staged by Damiano Michieletto featuring Patricia Racette and Roberto Frontali
Paul Hindemith: Mathis der Maler, conducted by Bertrand de Billy, staged by Keith Warner
Federico Moreno Torroba: Luisa Fernanda, conducted by Josep Caballé-Domenech, staged by Emilio Sagi
Giuseppe Verdi:
I due Foscari, conducted by James Conlon, staged by Thaddeus Strassberger with Plácido Domingo in the lead role
Attila, conducted by Riccardo Frizza, staged by Peter Konwitschny featuring Dmitry Beloselsky
Carl Maria von Weber: Der Freischütz, conducted by Bertrand de Billy, staged by Stefan Ruzowitzky

Premieres 

The  has seen the premieres of many works by celebrated composers and playwrights. It was a particularly favorite venue for Ludwig van Beethoven, who actually lived in rooms inside the theatre, at Schikaneder's invitation, during part of the period he was composing his opera Fidelio.

Works of Beethoven

1803 (April 5) Second Symphony, Third Piano Concerto and the oratorio Christ on the Mount of Olives
1805 (April 7) Third Symphony (Eroica)
1805 (November 20) The first version of Fidelio
1806 (December 23) Violin Concerto
1808 (December 22) Fifth and Sixth Symphonies, Choral Fantasy, Piano Concerto No. 4. See Beethoven concert of 22 December 1808.

Other premieres
1804 (November 10) Die Neger, the last opera composed by Antonio Salieri
1817 Die Ahnfrau by Franz Grillparzer
1823 Rosamunde, Fürstin von Zypern (Rosamunde, Princess of Cyprus), a play by Helmina von Chézy. According to one critic, "dreadful beyond imagination"  and utterly forgotten today, except for the incidental music by Franz Schubert
1844 (April 9)  by Johann Nestroy
1874 (April 5) Die Fledermaus by Johann Strauss II
1882 (December 6) Der Bettelstudent by Carl Millöcker
1885 (October 24) The Gypsy Baron by Johann Strauss II
1891 (January 10) Der Vogelhändler by Carl Zeller
1898 (January 5) Der Opernball by Richard Heuberger
1905 (December 30) The Merry Widow by Franz Lehár
1908 (November 14) The Chocolate Soldier by Oscar Straus
1909 (November 12) Der Graf von Luxemburg by Franz Lehár
1924 (February 28) Gräfin Mariza by Emmerich Kálmán

References 
Notes

Sources
Braunbehrens, Volkmar (1990) Mozart in Vienna. New York: Grove Weidenfeld.
Kurt Honolka,  (1990). Papageno: Emanuel Schikaneder, Man of the Theater in Mozart's Time. Portland, Oregon: Amadeus Press. .
Grove Dictionary of Music and Musicians, online edition. Copyright 2008, Oxford University Press.

External links 

 Official website of the opera house 
 Theater an der Wien, Andreas Praefcke's "Carthalia" – Theatres on Postcards; postcards, premieres
 Event listings in English from bachtrack.com

Buildings and structures in Mariahilf
Opera houses in Vienna
Concert halls in Austria
Cultural venues in Vienna
Theatres completed in 1801
Music venues completed in 1801
1801 establishments in Europe
1800s establishments in the Holy Roman Empire
1800s establishments in the Habsburg monarchy